OPK may refer to:

Oak Park railway station, Melbourne, Australia (Metro Trains station code)
Olli-Pekka Kallasvuo, former CEO of Nokia
Ovulation prediction kit
United Instrument Manufacturing Corporation (Russian: Объединённая приборостроительная корпорация)